Frankie Boyle's Tour of Scotland is a 2020 travel documentary series that aired on BBC Two. Consisting of four half-hour episodes, the programme was nominated for a British Academy Scotland Awards (BAFTA) Award.

Production
Boyle had previously done a travel documentary for the 2018 FIFA World Cup, Frankie Goes to Russia. The show was announced in July 2019, to be produced by Two Rivers. The programme aired on BBC Two in a Friday 10p.m. timeslot. The stand-up routine shown in the documentary was released under the title Frankie Boyle Live: Excited For You To See And Hate This in July 2020. Produced by Two Rivers, it was shown on BBC Two.

Episodes

Reception
The series was nominated for a British Academy Scotland Awards (BAFTA) Award in the category of Factual Series.

Lucy Mangan of The Guardian rated the series four stars out of five, saying that despite very rarely laughing out loud at television, she "belly-laughed throughout". Mangan praised Boyle as a "good guide, sufficiently engaged and detached at the same time". In another four star review, The Heralds Alison Rowat reviewed the first episode positively, calling Boyle "a pugnacious sort but a surprisingly good interviewer".

References

External links
 Official website

2020 British television series debuts
2020 British television series endings
BBC television documentaries